A policy framework is a document that sets out a set of procedures or goals, which might be used in negotiation or decision-making to guide a more detailed set of policies, or to guide ongoing maintenance of an organization's policies.

Policy framework or specific frameworks may refer to:

 Sender Policy Framework
 Security Policy Framework
NIST Cybersecurity Framework
 National Planning Policy Framework
 Investment Policy Framework for Sustainable Development
 National Policy Framework for Strategic Gateways and Trade Corridors